CM2, CM-2 or cm2 may refer to:
Configuration Management, previously known as CMII
The Chelmsford postcode area
Captain Marvel Jr. a fictional superhero
Championship Manager 2
Cocaine Muzik 2, a mixtape by rapper Yo Gotti
A primary school grade in the French educational system
cm2 (square centimetre)
CM2 (also CM2Limited) is a global strategy advisory company in Washington, DC
CM2, a group of meteorites
A type of contribution margin
 Connection Machine-2, a super computer
 Corby CM-2 Starlet, an amateur-built aircraft